The 2007 Cronulla-Sutherland Sharks season was the 41st in the club's history. They competed in the National Rugby League's 2007 Telstra Premiership and finished 11th (out of 16).

Season summary
The Sharks began the 2007 season afresh following Stuart Raper's dismissal from the club following its poor 2006 season. The Sharks signed former Brisbane Broncos bad boy Brett Seymour who was sacked by that club last year.

2007 was a season of near misses for the largely inexperienced Sharks side with a large number of games lost by 4 points or less. This was highlighted with their points difference of +60; if any of those narrow losses had been won, they would have finished in the top eight, even the top four. Notable wins included a first round shutout of the 2003 premiers Penrith 18-0 (indeed, Penrith went on to win the wooden spoon), a round nine win over the struggling premiers Brisbane at home which pitted NSW hopeful Greg Bird against Queensland captain Darren Lockyer, a golden point win over the Parramatta Eels at Parramatta, the venue of their infamous 74-4 loss just four years earlier and finally a 22-12 win over the Canberra Raiders in Canberra.

Ladder

Players

Isaac De Gois 24 8 0 0 32
Craig Stapleton 24 0 0 0 0
Luke Douglas 24 0 0 0 0
Ben Pomeroy 23 12 0 0 48
Luke Covell 23 10 68 0 176
Reece Williams 23 4 0 0 16
Kevin Kingston 22 1 0 0 4
Greg Bird 20 9 2 0 40
Paul Gallen 19 2 0 0 8
Fraser Anderson 18 6 0 0 24
Ben Ross 18 0 0 0 0
David Simmons 18 9 0 0 36
Lance Thompson 14 0 0 0 0
Adam Dykes 13 1 0 0 4
Brett Kimmorley 13 0 0 0 0
Mitch Brown 13 4 0 0 16
Jacob Selmes 10 0 0 0 0
Phillip Leuluai 10 1 0 0 4
Dayne Weston 10 0 0 0 0
Brett Seymour 10 0 7 1 15
Misi Taulapapa 9 2 0 0 8
Henry Perenara 9 2 0 0 8
Brett Kearney 8 5 0 0 20
Cameron Ciraldo 7 0 0 0 0
Eddie Sua 6 0 0 0 0
Paul Stephenson 6 1 0 0 4
Anthony Watts 5 0 0 0 0
Josh Hannay 3 0 0 0 0
Bryson Goodwin 2 0 0 0 0
Dane Nielson 1 0 0 0 0
Dustin Cooper 1 0 0 0 0

Club Awards
Player of the year- Paul Gallen
Chairman’s Award - Luke Covell
Rookie of the Year - Jacob Selmes
Clubman of the Year - Tony Bagnall
Premier League Player of the Year - Luke Sant
Premier League Coaches Award - Paul Stephenson
Jersey Flegg Players Award - Daniel Sayegh
Jersey Flegg Coaches Award - Jason Fletcher

Player movements
Gains

Losses

Re-Signings

References

Official Sharks Website www.sharks.com.au
NRL Stats www.nrlstats.com

Cronulla-Sutherland Sharks seasons
Cronulla-Sutherland Sharks season